The Samsung Galaxy J6 (also called the On6 in some markets like India) is an Android smartphone developed by the Korean manufacturer Samsung Electronics. Announced on May 22, 2018 and released the same day along with the Samsung Galaxy J4 and the Samsung Galaxy J8, the J6 is a mid-range model smartphone and a successor to the Samsung Galaxy J5 (2017).

The Galaxy J6 is the first in the J-series phones to have a near bezel-less design and to feature a sAMOLED 18.5:9 display.

It has a similar hardware design and software features to its high-end counterpart, the Galaxy A6.

The J6 is succeeded by the J6+ which featured a larger screen albeit switching from the sAMOLED screen found on the J6 to an LCD one.

It has Proximity sensor and accelerometer, and no ambient light sensor or gyroscope.

Hardware

The Samsung Galaxy J6 features a 720p Super AMOLED display, with an 18:5:9 aspect ratio dubbed as Samsung's ‘Infinity Display’. The J6 has a 5.6-inch panel, having around ~76.5% screen-to-body ratio and 294 ppi which was much similar to previous ones in the same line up. The J6's screen is protected by Corning Gorilla Glass 3.

The rear body is made out of plastic (specifically polycarbonate) with the intention to give it the same premium feel as metal-back phones.

The dimensions of the Samsung Galaxy J6 are 149.3 x 70.2 x 8.2 (height x width x thickness). The smartphone weighs .

It is equipped with Samsung's in-house octa-core Exynos 7870 which is clocked at a maximum of 1.6 GHz.

Charging the phone's 3,000 mAh lithium-ion battery takes about 2.5 hours on its micro-USB port.

The phone comes with a single 13 MP rear camera with autofocus coupled with an LED flash. The front shooter has 8 MP also with its own front flash. The phone's cameras work well in daylight, though most criticisms point out the bad performance of the cameras in low light.

Software
The Samsung Galaxy J6 2018 comes with Android 8.0 (Oreo) out of the box with Samsung Experience UI. Samsung's own Bixby is present as "Bixby Home" on the phone though lacks the assistant features found on the flagship S and Note series phones.

In May 2019, Samsung started rolling out its OTA software update for the Galaxy J6 to have the latest Android 9.0 (Pie) with One UI that also comes with Galaxy S10 phones. The update added features like night mode and a re-styled user interface.

The phone is secured either by PIN, pattern, password, fingerprint, or facial recognition. Using the fingerprint and/or facial recognition requires one of the three aforementioned traditional security inputs. The phone comes protected by Samsung's Knox software.

Networking
Networking includes:
 Wi-Fi 802.11 b/g/n, Wi-Fi Direct and hotspot (2.4 GHz Wi-Fi networks only, 5 GHz networks are not supported)
 4G VoLTE connection
 Bluetooth 4.2, A2DP, LE
 GPS, with A-GPS, GLONASS, BDS
 Stereo FM radio with recording option
 USB micro-USB 2
 USB On-The-Go enabled

Sensors
Sensors include

 Proximity sensor 
 Accelerometer (dual axis)
 Fingerprint (rear mounted)
 Hall Sensor

See also 

 Samsung Galaxy
 Samsung Galaxy J series
 Samsung Galaxy J2 Core
 Samsung Galaxy J3 (2018)
 Samsung Galaxy J4 Core
 Samsung Galaxy J4+
 Samsung Galaxy J6+
 Samsung Galaxy J8

References

Samsung smartphones
Android (operating system) devices
Mobile phones introduced in 2018
Discontinued smartphones